Instant Racing, known generically as historical race wagering, is an electronic gambling system that allows players to bet on replays of horse races or dog races that have already been run. Some Instant Racing terminals resemble slot machines.

Instant Racing is a product of PariMax Holdings, a subsidiary of the Stronach Group. A competing historical racing product is offered by Exacta Systems.

Gameplay
Gameplay begins when a player deposits his wager, and a race is randomly selected from a video library of over 60,000 previous races. Identifying information such as the location and date of the race, and the names of the horses and jockeys, is not shown. The player is able to view "Skill Graph" charts from the Daily Racing Form, showing information such as the jockeys' and trainers' winning percentages. Based on this handicapping information, the player picks the projected order of finish. Most players use the "handi helper", or "auto-cap" feature, which allows the machine to automatically make the selections on the player's behalf.

Payouts are based on traditional pari-mutuel processes. The player's wager is divvied up into several "betting pools" for different winning possibilities, such as picking the winner of the race, picking the top three finishers in exact order, or any of the three selections finishing first and second. The machine then shows a replay of all or a portion of the race. If the player achieved a particular type of "win", he receives the money from that pool, while the money in each of the other pools continues to accumulate until another bettor wins it.

Early versions of Instant Racing terminals closely resembled self-serve wagering terminals. Later terminals began to mimic slot machines, with symbols on spinning reels corresponding to the results of the player's wager, and the video of the race occupying only a 2-inch square in the corner of the display. Some versions show a computer-animated re-enactment of the race rather than a video.

History
The idea of historical race wagering was conceived by Eric Jackson, general manager of Oaklawn Park. He brought the idea to three major companies in January 1997, but found no takers. Later in the year, he met with Ted Mudge, president of AmTote, who liked the idea and asked Jackson to present it to experts at a February 1998 racing industry gathering in Maryland. The project gathered momentum from there. The Arkansas General Assembly took steps in 1999 to authorize Instant Racing by removing the requirement that simulcast races be shown live. A test deployment was launched in January 2000 at Oaklawn Park and Southland Greyhound Park, with 50 machines at each track. The machines proved popular and Jackson reported that as many as a dozen other tracks were pursuing approval to install the machines within two months of the test.

By state

Alabama
Historical horse racing machines are in operation at Birmingham Race Course Casino, a former greyhound racing track in Birmingham. They are also planned to be added to Victoryland, another former greyhound track.

The state attorney general opined in 2001 and 2008 that historical racing could be legal under existing parimutuel wagering laws. The machines were first installed in 2019 at Birmingham Race Course.

Idaho
The Idaho Legislature legalized Instant Racing in 2013, and machines were soon installed at Les Bois Park, Greyhound Park, and the Double Down Bar & Grill in Idaho Falls. State legislators then enacted a ban on the machines in early 2015, claiming they had been misled about the game's nature, but the ban was vetoed by Governor Butch Otter. However, the Coeur d'Alene Tribe, which operates a casino that competes with the racetracks, successfully sued to invalidate Otter's veto, and the ban went into effect in September 2015, resulting in the shutdown of the state's historical racing parlors. A ballot initiative to re-legalize the machines, Proposition 1, was rejected by voters in 2018.

Kansas
Kansas legislators enacted a historical racing law in 2022, authorizing one facility in the Wichita area with up to 1,000 machines.

Kentucky
The Kentucky Horse Racing Commission modified its definition of parimutuel wagering in July 2010 to allow Instant Racing, and at the same time asked a court to review whether the change was legal. The court approved the changes and anti-gambling activists appealed the decision.  The anti-gambling activists' appeal reached the Kentucky Supreme Court, which ruled in February 2014 that the Horse Racing Commission could authorize parimutuel wagering on historical races, but remanded the case for further proceedings to determine whether the terminals meet the definition of parimutuel wagering. In 2020, the Supreme Court finally ruled that at least the Exacta Systems product was not parimutuel. The next year, however, state legislators updated the definition of parimutuel wagering to explicitly allow historical horse racing, citing its importance to the state's racing industry.

Even while the legal fight unfolded, Kentucky Downs installed Instant Racing terminals in September 2011, Ellis Park followed suit a year later, and the Red Mile opened a historical racing parlor in partnership with Keeneland in September 2015. Derby City Gaming, a standalone historical racing parlor, opened in 2018. As of 2021, development was underway on a historical racing parlor at Turfway Park and on a second Derby City Gaming location.

Louisiana
In 2021, Louisiana lawmakers authorized historical racing at off-track betting parlors, with up to 50 machines per location.

Nebraska
Nebraska has seen several attempts to legalize the machines. The Nebraska Legislature voted to authorize the machines in 2012, but the bill was vetoed by Governor Dave Heineman. The legislature then approved a state constitutional amendment in 2014 to allow historical racing, but it was struck from the ballot by the Nebraska Supreme Court based on a technicality. The state racing commission attempted in 2018 to approve the machines, but backed off after Attorney General Doug Peterson argued that the move was unconstitutional.

New Hampshire
In 2021, New Hampshire legalized historic horse racing machines at charitable gaming facilities.

Oregon
The Oregon Racing Commission approved Instant Racing machines at the state's racetracks in April 2003. Twenty units were installed at Multnomah Greyhound Park the next month. The terminals were moved to Portland Meadows in October. They were removed in November 2003 at the direction of the tracks' parent company, Magna Entertainment. The Commission in 2006 approved a request from Magna to bring the game back to Portland Meadows, but then reversed itself a year later under pressure from Attorney General Hardy Myers, who believed the machines to be illegal.

The state enacted a new law legalizing Instant Racing in June 2013, and the game was relaunched at Portland Meadows in February 2015. Portland Meadows closed in 2019.

Another horse track, Grants Pass Downs, sought to open a historical racing parlor with 225 machines. Their application was denied after the state Department of Justice determined that the latest generation of machines were games of chance rather than parimutuel betting, and therefore would violate the state constitution's prohibitions against casinos and private lotteries.

Texas
The Texas Racing Commission adopted rules in August 2014 to allow historical wagering at the state's horse and dog tracks.  However, in November 2014, a judge struck down the new rules, finding that historical wagering was a new type of wagering not authorized by existing statutes. The decision was appealed, but the Commission, under strong pressure from state legislators, repealed the historical wagering rules before the appeal could be decided.

Virginia
Virginia enacted a law to allow historical wagering in April 2018, in an effort to make it economically viable to reopen the state's only horse track, Colonial Downs. The racetrack's historical racing parlor opened in April 2019, with additional machines to follow at several off-track betting parlors around the state, branded as Rosie's Gaming Emporium.

Wyoming
Instant Racing machines were installed at Wyoming's four off-track betting parlors beginning in July 2003, after approval of the Wyoming Pari-Mutuel Commission. The machines' legality was soon called into question by the state Attorney General, and they were removed in 2005 following a court ruling. The Wyoming Supreme Court ultimately ruled them illegal in 2006, calling the game "a slot machine that attempts to mimic traditional pari-mutuel wagering". In 2013, the state legislature re-legalized Instant Racing. By December 2016, machines were in operation at 14 betting parlors across the state.

References

External links

Exacta Systems

Gaming devices
Sports betting
Horse racing controversies
Horse racing in the United States
Horse-related video games
Games and sports introduced in 2000
Greyhound racing